Khadal is a town and former minor Princely state in Gujarat, western India.

History 
Khadal was a Fourth Class princely state and taluka, comprising twelve more villages, covering eight square miles in Mahi Kantha, ruled by Kshatriya Makwana Koli Chieftains who converted to Islam.

It had a combined population of 2,215 in 1901, yielding a state revenue of 16,450 Rupees (less than half from land), paying tributes of 1,751 Rupees to the Gaekwad Baroda State and 250 Rupees to Attarsumba.

External links and sources 
 Imperial Gazetteer on DSAL - Mahi Kantha

Specific

Princely states of Gujarat
Koli princely states
Muslim princely states of India